Kryptopterus bicirrhis, often called the glass catfish, is an Asian glass catfish species of the genus Kryptopterus. Until 1989, the concept of K. bicirrhis included its smaller relative Kryptopterus vitreolus ("ghost catfish";  often confused with K. minor). Its scientific name K. bicirrhis and common name glass catfish are often still used in the aquarium fish trade to refer to the actual K. vitreolus; as it seems, the larger and more aggressive true K. bicirrhis was only ever exported in insignificant numbers.

In western Borneo, where K. minor and K. bicirrhis are sympatric, both species are known as lais tipis in the Malay language, but when locals want to distinguish the two, they refer to K. minor as lais limpok. In Cambodia it is known as trey kes prak and used to make the fermented fish paste prahok.

Description
The true K. bicirrhis is easily separated from K. vitreolus. K. bicirrhis reaches a significantly larger size, up to  standard length, and most of its body is not clearly transparent (only obviously transparent around the head). The body of K. bicirrhis is mostly opaque and light greyish.

When struck by light, it has an iridescence, and it turns milky white when it dies. It has two long barbels for locating food, which are as long again as the body in front of the anal fin. The dorsal fin is reduced to a tiny triangle, and the pectoral fins are longer than the head.

Ecology
Kryptopterus bicirrhis is found in Borneo, Sumatra, the Malay Peninsula, and the Chao Phraya and Mekong drainage basins.

This freshwater catfish inhabits large rivers with turbid water, where they typically live near the shore in fast-flowing water. It is a diurnal predator and mainly eats water bugs and occasionally smaller fishes.

See also 

List of freshwater aquarium fish species

References

Siluridae
Fish of Asia
Fish of the Mekong Basin
Fish of Cambodia
Freshwater fish of Indonesia
Fish of Laos
Freshwater fish of Malaysia
Fish of Thailand
Fish of Vietnam
Fish described in 1840